The 2012 National Hockey League All-Star Game, (also known as the 2012 Tim Hortons NHL All-Star Game) took place on January 29, 2012, at Scotiabank Place in Ottawa. This edition of the All-Star Game featured the "fantasy draft" format first seen in the previous 2011 NHL All-Star Game. The participating players voted for team captains, selecting Daniel Alfredsson of the All-Star host Ottawa Senators and Zdeno Chara of the defending Stanley Cup champion, the Boston Bruins.

The event marked the first time the city of Ottawa hosted an NHL All-Star Game. Ottawa has hosted two NHL Entry Drafts, a Stanley Cup Final and the World Junior Championships all in the past five years. It marked the 20th anniversary of the Ottawa Senators joining the NHL. It was the second All-Star Game that Canada has hosted in the past three years, as the Montreal Canadiens hosted it in 2009. Winning goaltender Tim Thomas became the only goaltender in NHL history to win four consecutive All-Star games.

Rosters

Fan balloting
Voting for NHL all-star players started on November 14, 2011. Online voting required fans to register with the NHL.com web site, with votes limited to 30 votes per "platform", i.e. desktop computer, web-enabled mobile devices and SMS text. Fans were presented a list of 127 players, sub-divided into Forwards, Defence and Goaltending. Three forwards, two defence and one goaltender could be selected from the League-wide list of players. The selection of League-wide list of players was done in 2011, which used the "fantasy team" format.

After voting closed, Erik Karlsson was the leading vote-getter with 939,951. Senators fans voted in force, electing not only Karlsson but all three forwards as well (Daniel Alfredsson, Jason Spezza and Milan Michalek) to the starting lineup. The only skater not coming from the hometown Senators was Toronto Maple Leafs defenceman Dion Phaneuf. Phaneuf beat out Senators defenceman Sergei Gonchar by  only 11,305 votes. Reigning Vezina and Conn Smythe Trophy winner Tim Thomas was elected as the fan-voted goaltender.

Draft
After naming the remaining All-Stars, the participating players voted for team captains, selecting Daniel Alfredsson of the hosting Ottawa Senators and Zdeno Chara of the defending Stanley Cup champion Boston Bruins. Alfredsson's team would wear white, while Team Chara would wear blue. The NHL named the coaches: head coach Claude Julien, and assistants Doug Houda, Doug Jarvis and Geoff Ward of the Boston Bruins for Team Chara; and John Tortorella of the New York Rangers and Todd McLellan of the San Jose Sharks as co-coaches for Team Alfredsson.

The draft of the players took place on January 26, 2012, from 8:00 pm to 9:30 pm, Eastern time. It was held at the Théâtre du Casino du Lac-Leamy, in Gatineau, Quebec. Team Chara won the puck flip and selected first.

Rookies

Source: NHL.

Withdrawn
Prior to the draft several players withdrew due to injury or personal reasons:

Game summary
The game was played from 4pm until 7pm local time. It was broadcast nationally in Canada on CBC, and in the United States on the NBC Sports Network. Canadian rapper Drake performed during the second intermission. Javier Colon sang the American national anthem while Ottawa Senators anthem singer Lyndon Slewidge sang the Canadian national anthem.

W – Tim Thomas
L – Brian Elliott

 Missed Penalty Shot: Stamkos, TAS, 16:33 first.
 Shots on Goal:
 Team Alfredsson: 14-15-21-50.
 Team Chara: 12-13-19-44.

Source: NHL.

SuperSkills Competition
The competition was held at Scotiabank Place on January 28, 2012 between 7pm and 10pm local time. It was broadcast nationally in Canada on CBC, and in the United States on the NBC Sports Network.

Fastest Skater
In this event, pairs of skaters raced each other simultaneously on parallel courses on the rink. Each race was worth one point for their winning racer's team, and the fastest two skaters then had a final race for another point.

Breakaway Challenge
In this competition, competitors skated with the puck and attempted to score on the opposing team's goalie. The winner was also judged on their presentation. The winner was determined by SMS messages sent to the NHL. The winner, Patrick Kane, donned a Superman cape and Clark Kent-style glasses, skated in and dove to the ice, passed the puck from his left hand to his stick held in his right hand and scored. Runner-up Corey Perry threw away his stick and gloves and removed a hidden mini-stick from his equipment. He then skated in and deked out the goaltender with his stick. Kane, in his second attempt as Superman, shot a puck designed to explode into pieces.

Accuracy Shooting
In this event, competitors were positioned in front of the net, and were passed the puck from two players situated behind the goal line. The players had to hit targets at the four corners of the net in the fastest time.

Challenge Relay
In this competition, teams were selected from each side. Each player on the team had one skill to complete before the next player could start. The goal was to complete the relay in the fastest time.

Hardest Shot
In this competition, players skated in from the blue line, and slapped a puck as fast as possible on the net.

Elimination Shootout
In this competition, players attempted to score on the opposing team's goalie. Players who scored earned a point for their team for each goal they scored. Players were eliminated from the competition if they failed to score.

italics = Heat winner
bold = Event winner
each heat and event winner earns a point for their team

Source: NHL

All-Star Weekend
In conjunction with the Game and the Skills Competition, events were held from January 26 through January 29. The NHL held a "Fan Fair" at the Ottawa Convention Centre. The Fan Fair had displays of the NHL's trophies, autograph signings, interactive displays and presentations and broadcasts by the NHL's SiriusXM and NHL Network partners. Team and All-Star Game merchandise and memorabilia was also for sale. Events were held on the Rideau Canal, at Confederation Park and at the Byward Market. Ottawa's annual Winterlude winter carnival opened its site at Confederation Park one week early for the game weekend. Activities include:
 NHL Trophy Procession on the Rideau Canal Skateway
 Ice Sculptures at Confederation Park
 Nightly DJs at Confederation Park
 Energizer Night Skate at NHL All-Star on the Rideau Canal Skateway
 All-Star Concert in The Cabin at The Great Canadian Cabin nightclub in the Byward Market
 Canadian Tire NHL Junior Skills National Championship on the Rideau Canal Skateway

Weather conditions forced the closure of the Rideau Canal to public skating during the weekend. The trophy procession and junior skills competition were able to be held on the canal according to schedule. The Energizer Night Skate was moved to the Rink of Dreams ice rink nearby.

Interest in the four-day festivities broke records across the board in terms of North American television ratings and digital consumption, according to figures released by the NHL. Across North America, 17.7 million viewers tuned into all or part of NHL All-Star Weekend events, including the Molson Canadian NHL All-Star Fantasy Player Draft held at the Hilton Lac Leamy. Those events were televised on CBC, TSN and RDS in Canada, and by the NBC Sports Network in the United States.

In Canada, CBC recorded its highest viewership for the NHL All-Star Game and skills competition since the current system of audience measurement was instituted in 1989–90. In all, 10.2 million viewers tuned into at least some part of CBC's coverage, representing 30% of the Canadian population. Meanwhile, the player draft attracted 1.34 million viewers on TSN and another 254,000 on RDS. A total of 3.7 million unique viewers saw at least part of the telecast.

References 

National Hockey League All-Star Games
All
2012 National Hockey League All-Star Game
2012 in Ontario